Alypia octomaculata, the eight-spotted forester, is a moth of the family Noctuidae first described by Johan Christian Fabricius in 1775. It is native to Canada, but can be found today throughout Northern America, ranging between Nova Scotia to Florida and South Dakota to Texas. Their habitats being rather specific, they make home where wooded areas meet open fields.

Description 

The moth is overall black with two spots on each wing (total of eight spots), it's forewing ranges between shades of white, cream, or yellow. These moths are active during the day and night, often being mistaken as a butterfly.

Larvae 
The larvae feed on the underside of leaves and stems of grapevines, peppervines and Virginia creepers. A. octomaculata larvae are considered somewhat of a pest in commercial and decorative vineyards. 

When threatened, their first line of defense is to vomit a foul orange tinted liquid. It escapes by falling off of its perch, still attached to it by the silk thread excreted from its mouth.

Larvae who are still around during the fall like to spin their soft-walled cocoon into partial decayed material such as wood, soil, and even trash. Some mature caterpillars even die when they aren't given an opportunity to bore themselves into something pulpy and suitable.

Pupae 
Like many other moths, A. octomaculata have the ability to remain in something called a diapause, a dormant state in which their development is delayed, up to as far as 4 years long on record. The conditions of when they decide to hatch is unknown.

Adults 
A. octomaculata are univoltine more north, flying late spring from April to June to produce one generation. In warmer climates there may be two annual broods and even attempts at three. The matured adults feed on nectar from flowers of herbaceous plants. When their initial brood peaks, during March, the adults fly to flowers such as that of Sweetleaf.

Gallery

Subspecies
 Alypia octomaculata octomaculata (Fabricuis, 1775) 
 Alypia octomaculata matuta (H. Edwards, 1883)

References

External links
illinoiswildflowers.info
Butterfliesandmoths.org

Agaristinae
Moths of North America
Moths described in 1775
Taxa named by Johan Christian Fabricius